Marquiss A'kil James Spencer (born July 16, 1997) is an American football defensive end for the New York Jets of the National Football League (NFL). He played college football at Mississippi State and was drafted by the Denver Broncos in the seventh round, 253rd overall, in the 2021 NFL Draft.

Professional career

Denver Broncos
Spencer was drafted by the Denver Broncos in the seventh round, 253rd overall, of the 2021 NFL Draft. He signed his four-year rookie contract on May 13, 2021. He was waived on August 31, 2021 and re-signed to the practice squad the next day. On January 2, 2022, Spencer made his NFL debut in the team's week 17 game against the Los Angeles Chargers, collecting a tackle in the 34-13 loss. He signed a reserve/future contract with the Broncos on January 11, 2022.

Spencer was waived on August 22, 2022.

New York Jets
On November 22, 2022, Spencer was signed to the New York Jets practice squad. He signed a reserve/future contract on January 9, 2023.

References

1997 births
Living people
People from Greenwood, Mississippi
Players of American football from Mississippi
American football defensive ends
Mississippi State Bulldogs football players
Denver Broncos players
New York Jets players